Athrips neimongolica is a moth of the family Gelechiidae. It is found in China (Inner Mongolia).

The wingspan is 10–12 mm. The forewings are light, covered with creamy brown-tipped scales. There are small dark spots surrounded by yellowish scales at one-fourth, one-half and two-thirds. The hindwings are light grey. Adults are on wing in August.

Etymology
The species name refers to the type locality and is derived from Chinese Nei Mongol (meaning Inner Mongolia).

References

Moths described in 2009
Athrips
Moths of Asia